Dioptis zarza is a moth of the family Notodontidae first described by Paul Dognin in 1894. It is found in Ecuador.

References

Moths described in 1894
Notodontidae of South America